Palacio Rinaldi is a building in Centro, Montevideo, Uruguay, located on the Plaza Independencia near its junction with the 18 de Julio Avenue, near the Palacio Salvo.

It is a fine example of Art Deco architecture, built in 1929, by the architects Alberto Isola and Guillermo Armas.

It has been a Municipal Site of Interest since 1997.

References

External links
Universitad ORT Facultad de Arquitectura
Mention of Palacio Rinaldi as a building of Heritage value -IMM

Buildings and structures in Montevideo
Centro, Montevideo
Buildings and structures completed in 1929